H6: Diary of a Serial Killer  is a 2006 Spanish horror film directed by Martín Garrido Barón and was written by Martín Garrido.

Plot
H6 tells the story of Antonio Frau, a serial killer set free after serving 25 years in jail for the violent murder of his girlfriend. After inheriting an old motel from a relative he never knew, he sees this as a signal and takes to his holy task of relieving the grief of those who have lost the will to live. He takes his victims to room Number 6 in the motel where he 'purifies' them, while, at the same time, continues his everyday life next to his wife. A mistake leads to his arrest, and his plan to become rich and famous takes relevance.

Cast
 Fernando Acaso as Antonio Frau
 Ángel Alarcón	as Francisca's Father
 Raquel Arenas as Rosa
 Ruperto Ares as Pablo
 María José Bausá as Francisca
 Ramón Del Pomar as Curro
 Miquel Fernandez as Antonio Frau
 Martín Garrido as Miguel Oliver
 Antonio Mayans as Dr. Planas
 Sonia Moreno as Tina
 Xènia Reguant as Marisa
 Mark San Juan	as Peralta
 Alejo Sauras as Cristóbal
 Elena Seguí as Soledad Mendez
 Miquel Sitjar as Flores

Release
The film premiered on 29 April 2005 as part of the Málaga Film Festival. It was on 3 November 2005 part of the San Sebastián Horror and Fantasy Film Festival and the renomated Festival de Cine Negro de Manresa on 19 November 2005. H6 had a theatrical release in Spain on 7 July 2006 and was in the United States released as direct to video production on 21 November 2006.

References

External links

2005 films
2000s Spanish-language films
2000s thriller films
2005 horror films
2000s crime films
Spanish horror films
2000s crime thriller films
Spanish thriller films
2000s serial killer films
Spanish serial killer films